Nick Ralston (born November 10, 1996) is an American football fullback who is a free agent. He played college football at Louisiana and Arizona State. He signed with the Cowboys after going undrafted in the 2021 NFL draft.

Professional career

After the vast majority of College Pro Days were canceled in 2020 due to the COVID-19 pandemic, Ralston did not sign with an NFL team. Afterwards, Ralston continued to train for the next year in preparation for 2021 College Pro Days. In March 2021, Ralston had his Pro Day opportunity at the University of Louisiana. His results were among the best in the nation for fullback prospects. Moments after the 2021 draft concluded, Ralston received calls from multiple teams and committed to sign immediately with the Dallas Cowboys. He was waived on August 31, 2021 and re-signed to the practice squad the next day. He was promoted to the active roster on October 16, 2021. He was waived on October 19 and re-signed to the practice squad. He signed a reserve/future contract with the Cowboys on January 18, 2022. He was waived on July 28, 2022.

References

1996 births
Living people
Arizona State Sun Devils football players
Dallas Cowboys players
Louisiana Ragin' Cajuns football players